Jim Berney is a visual effects supervisor who has worked on films such as The Chronicles of Narnia: The Lion, the Witch and the Wardrobe, The Lord of the Rings: The Two Towers and I Am Legend.

He received a nomination for Best Visual Effects at the 78th Academy Awards for his work on The Chronicles of Narnia: The Lion, the Witch and the Wardrobe. He shared his nomination with Scott Farrar, Bill Westenhofer and Dean Wright.

Selected filmography
Batman Forever (1995)
Mortal Kombat (1995)
Under Siege 2: Dark Territory (1995)
Anaconda (1997)
Contact (1997)
Starship Troopers (1997)
Godzilla (1998)
Stuart Little (1999)
Hollow Man (2000)
Harry Potter and the Sorcerer's Stone (2001)
The Lord of the Rings: The Two Towers (2002)
Men in Black II (2002)
The Matrix Reloaded (2003)
The Matrix Revolutions (2003)
The Chronicles of Narnia: The Lion, the Witch and the Wardrobe (2005)
I Am Legend (2007)
Eagle Eye (2008)
Green Lantern (2011)
Divergent (2014)
Minecraft (TBA)

References

External links
 

Living people
Special effects people
Year of birth missing (living people)
Place of birth missing (living people)